Duncan Vann Williford (born January 26, 1948) is an American former professional basketball player. He played one season for the American Basketball Association's Carolina Cougars during the 1970–71 ABA season. He is a native of Fayetteville, North Carolina, and currently owns a North Carolina-based material handling equipment company, Atlantic Coast Toyotalift.

Notes

External links
ABA stats @ basketballreference.com

1948 births
Living people
American men's basketball players
Basketball players from North Carolina
Carolina Cougars players
NC State Wolfpack men's basketball players
Phoenix Suns draft picks
Small forwards
Sportspeople from Fayetteville, North Carolina